Sikhs served in the British Indian Army throughout the British Raj. 
Sikh units fought at the Battle of Saragarhi; in the First World War, as the "Black Lions", as well as during the Second World War in Malaya, Burma and Italy.

Pre-1914

General 
Maharaja Ranjit Singh who was good friends with the 2nd Nizam of Hyderabad (Nizam Ali Khan) had sent 1200 Sikh soldiers who became a part of the Nizams army.
After the fall of the Sikh Empire and death of its king Maharaja Ranjit Singh, the British conquered this large territory with much difficulty as it was the last kingdom in India to be taken over by the British, and began recruiting Sikhs into their army in large numbers.

Battle of Saragarhi

The Battle of Saragarhi is considered one of the great battles in Sikh military history. On 12 September 1897 a contingent of twenty-one soldiers from the 36th Sikhs regiment (now the 4th Battalion of the Sikh Regiment of Indian Army), led by Havildar Ishar Singh held off an Afghan attack of 10,000 men for several hours. All 21 Sikh soldiers chose to fight to the death instead of surrendering. In recognition of their sacrifice, the British Parliament paid them respect, and each one of them was awarded the Indian Order of Merit (equivalent to the Victoria Cross).

World War One
Known afterwards as the Lions of the Great War, during the war they were often called the Black Lions. Sikhs were allowed to use traditional Sikh weapons such as chakrams and talwar swords, and it was not uncommon to see the Sikh Holy Scriptures; The 11th Sikh Guru, Sri Guru Granth Sahib Ji, being carried before a marching Sikh battalion or even on the front lines among the battling Sikh troops.

Mesopotamia

East Africa

World War Two

Battle of Malaya

The strength of the army in Malaya was 104,625 troops. Sikhs represented more than 60 percent of the total Indian force that fought against the Japanese invasion of Malaysia and Singapore.

Burma Campaign 

Sikhs served with distinction in repelling the attempted invasion of India by the Japanese, and subsequently in dislodging them from Burma (now Myanmar).

Italian Campaign 

Sikhs served with distinction during the Allied invasion of Italy.

North Africa

Gallery

See also
Indian Army during World War I

References

Military of British India
Sikh warriors
History of Sikhism